John Geddie may refer to:

 John Geddie (secretary) (floruit 1575–1605), Scottish royal secretary and calligrapher
 John Geddie (journalist) (1848–1937), Scottish journalist and author of several books mainly on the subject of Edinburgh
 John Geddie (missionary) (1815–1872), Scots-Canadian missionary to the New Hebrides